Jablonica is a village and municipality in Senica District in the Trnava Region of western Slovakia.

History
In historical records the village was first mentioned in 1262.

Geography
The municipality lies at an altitude of 211 metres and covers an area of 31.44 km². It has a population of about 2,279 people.

Points of interest
The Jablonica castle is associated with the Apponyi family and specifically its so-called Jablonica line. An old castle was destroyed in an Ottoman raid in 1663 and subsequently rebuilt by the then-owners from the family. A branch of the Apponyis acquired it in 1772 and renovated it extensively in the late 19th century. The Apponyis lost its property in the aftermath of World War I, after which it changed hands several times during the Interwar period. It then served as a grain storage facility, a home for the occupying Wehrmacht, an elementary school, and a leather storehouse. In 2017 it was purchased by a non-profit group that intends to renovate it and convert into a hotel and cultural facility.

Genealogical resources

The records for genealogical research are available at the state archive "Statny Archiv in Bratislava, Slovakia"

 Roman Catholic church records (births/marriages/deaths): 1692-1895 (parish A)
 Lutheran church records (births/marriages/deaths): 1733-1902 (parish B)

See also
 List of municipalities and towns in Slovakia

External links

Official page
Surnames of living people in Jablonica

References

Villages and municipalities in Senica District